Apera is a small genus of annual grasses, known commonly as silkybent grass or windgrass. They are native to Europe, North Africa and parts of Asia but have been introduced and naturalized in much of North and South America.

 Species
 Apera baytopiana Dogan - Muğla Province in southwestern Turkey
 Apera intermedia Hack. - Turkey, Aegean Islands, Iraq, Iran, Caucasus; naturalized in Primorye
 Apera interrupta (L.) P.Beauv. - dense silkybent, interrupted windgrass - Eurasia and North Africa from Portugal to Sweden to Algeria to Kazakhstan; naturalized in Argentina, Chile, United States, Canada
 Apera spica-venti (L.) P. Beauv. - loose silkybent, common windgrass - Eurasia and North Africa from Canary Islands to Denmark to Yakutia; naturalized in United States, Canada, and Russian Far East
 Apera triaristata Dogan - Denizli Province in southwestern Turkey

 formerly included
see Agrostis Anemanthele Dichelachne Muhlenbergia Sporobolus

See also
 List of Poaceae genera

References

Pooideae
Grasses of Africa
Grasses of Asia
Grasses of Europe
Poaceae genera
Taxa named by Michel Adanson
Taxa named by Palisot de Beauvois